Atimia confusa, known generally as the small cedar borer or small cedar-bark borer, is a species of long-horned beetle in the family Cerambycidae. It is found in North America.

Subspecies
These three subspecies belong to the species Atimia confusa:
 Atimia confusa confusa (Say, 1826)
 Atimia confusa dorsalis LeConte, 1869
 Atimia confusa maritima Linsley, 1939

References

Further reading

External links

 

Spondylidinae
Articles created by Qbugbot
Beetles described in 1826